Upeshka De Silva is a Sri Lankan-American professional poker player from Katy, Texas. A three-time World Series of Poker (WSOP) bracelet winner, in 2020 he made the final table of the WSOP Main Event.

De Silva was born in 1988, in Colombo, Sri Lanka and moved to the city of Katy, Texas in the United States when he 2 years old. He graduated from the University of Houston with degrees in history and political science. 

At first, De Silva played in small home games with his high school friends. He got especially hooked on poker after the Moneymaker phenomenon and reading Doyle Brunson’s Super/System 2 book.

In 2012, he began his poker career playing private cash games in Texas. De Silva made his first WSOP final table in 2013 when he finished in seventh in the $1,500 Millionaire Maker event. In 2015, he won his first bracelet, outlasting a field of 1,655 in a $1,500 No Limit Hold'em event and earning $424,577. He also finished in 36th place in the Main Event that year.

De Silva's second WSOP bracelet came in a $3,000 No Limit Hold'em Shootout event in 2017. He added a third bracelet in an online event on WSOP.com in 2019. De Silva had made five WSOP final tables and cashed 49 times for $1,613,000 prior to the 2020 Main Event.

De Silva made the final table of the 2020 Main Event, the first portion of which was held on WSOP.com, in eighth chip position. The day before the final table, however, he tested positive for COVID-19 and was disqualified, being awarded ninth place.

De Silva has also made three final tables on the World Poker Tour. He also finished in fifth at the WPT Montreal in November 2018. In March 2020, De Silva made the final table of the L.A. Poker Classic, but the tournament was delayed more than a year by the COVID-19 pandemic; he eventually finished in sixth place.

As of 2021, De Silva has live tournament winnings of $3,109,000.

World Series of Poker bracelets

References

External links
Hendon Mob profile
WSOP.com profile

American poker players
World Series of Poker bracelet winners
University of Houston alumni
People from Katy, Texas
American people of Sri Lankan descent
Living people
Year of birth missing (living people)